Saltuarius swaini, also known as the southern leaf-tailed gecko or Border Ranges leaf-tailed gecko  is endemic to Australia. where it is found in coastal mountain ranges of southeastern Queensland and northern New South Wales.
It inhabits rainforests and lives inside large tree root systems and hollows of strangler figs.

Camouflage
When threatened or caught geckos can drop their tail to confuse predators. Eventually a new tail will be regenerated, although only the original tail will have the tubercules and matching colour and pattern to the torso; new tails will be very different in both colour and pattern. Southern leaf tailed geckos are a light to dark brown colour with darker patterns.

Life cycle
Female southern leaf-tailed geckos usually lay one or two soft-shelled eggs in late spring. These eggs are up to 28 mm in length. The eggs are buried in moist soil or leaf litter to prevent their drying out. Left to develop unattended, 3 months later the offspring hatch and begin fending for themselves, catching insects within only a few days of birth. They take up to two years to fully mature and then can survive for up to eight more years.

Diet
The southern leaf-tailed gecko eats mostly insects.

References

Geckos of Australia
Saltuarius
Reptiles described in 1985
Taxa named by Richard Walter Wells
Taxa named by Cliff Ross Wellington